Meathop and Ulpha is a former civil parish, now in the parish of Witherslack, Meathop and Ulpha, in the South Lakeland district of the English county of Cumbria. In 2001 it had a population of 143, increasing slightly to 154 at the Census 2011. It included the village of Meathop.

There were two Sites of Special Scientific Interest in the parish:
 Meathop Moss is a raised peat-bog designated an SSSI for its biological interest. Leased by the Society for the Promotion of Nature Reserves in 1919, it now belongs to the Cumbria Wildlife Trust.  
 Meathop Woods and Quarry, which consists of woodland and a disused quarry on the side of a hill, has biological and geological interest.

History 
Meathop and Ulpha was formerly a township in Beetham parish, from 1866 Meathop and Ulpha was a civil parish in its own right until it was abolished on 1 April 2015 and merged with Witherslack to form "Witherslack, Meathop and Ulpha".

See also

Listed buildings in Meathop and Ulpha

References

External links

 Cumbria County History Trust: Meathop and Ulpha (nb: provisional research only – see Talk page)
 British History Online
 British Listed Buildings
 Genuki
 Geograph

Former civil parishes in Cumbria
South Lakeland District